Viggo Thorvald Edvard Weie (18 November 1879 - 9 April 1943) was a Danish Modernist painter.
 He was a recipient of Eckersberg Medal in 1925. He died during 1943 in Frederiksberg.

Biography 
Weie was born in Copenhagen, Denmark. His father went away when Edvard was still very young and left his family in poverty. To help out, he would deliver newspapers every morning before school and later worked as a house painter. Despite the hardship, he was able to take art lessons. When he came of age, he went to Copenhagen to apply for admission to the Royal Danish Academy of Fine Arts, but was not accepted.

It was not until 1905, when he was already twenty-five years old, that he was able to enter the Kunstnernes Frie Studieskoler, operated by Kristian Zahrtmann (1843–1917). It was there that he was introduced to modern art. He became a favored student and accompanied Zahrtmann on a trip to Italy in 1907, but returned prematurely when they had a falling-out.

Back in Denmark, he painted a series of interiors and landscapes. From 1911 to 1920, he would spend part of every year painting on the island of Christiansø. It was there he met the Swedish painter Karl Isakson (1878–1922). After Isakson's early death in 1922, Weie made an extensive study of his uses of color, and applied what he learned to his own works.

 
He had begun by painting works with a mythological or literary basis, but later came to favor street scenes and views of Copenhagen harbor. He would often paint several versions of the same concept. Due to his intense self-criticism, many of these would end up in the fire. Over the years, his works became increasingly abstract.

He was awarded the Eckersberg Medal in 1925, but he was not a member of any artistic movement and contributed numerous harsh critical pieces to newspapers and magazines that served to isolate him from his peers. He felt that contemporary Danish art was in a crisis and lacked human values. In his later years, he rarely exhibited, but gave much of his time to writing a book that would clearly summarize his opinions. It was published posthumously, in 1951, by his widow, under the title Poesi og Kultur. He died during 1943 in Frederiksberg and was buried at Vestre Kirkegard in Copenhagen.

Selected paintings

References

Further reading
 Henrik Bramsen, Ellen Poulsen and Lennart Gottlieb, Edvard Weie, National Gallery of Denmark 1987 
 Ingeborg Bugge, Henrik Juhl Andersen, Edvard Weie og symbolismen: et spor i malerens skrifter og billeder, Aarhus Universitetsforlag, 2001  
 Ingeborg Bugge, Aase Bak, Edvard Weie : steder og stemninger, Nordjyllands Kunstmuseum, 2003

External links 

 ArtNet: More works by Weie.

1879 births
1943 deaths
19th-century Danish painters
Danish male painters
20th-century Danish painters
Recipients of the Eckersberg Medal
Artists from Copenhagen
Abstract artists
Expressionist painters
19th-century Danish male artists
20th-century Danish male artists